Diana Florence Hill  (born 1943) is a New Zealand academic, and a full professor at the University of Otago, specialising in molecular genetics. Hill's team's work on the genetics of animal production was awarded a Silver Medal by the Royal Society in 1996. She has been a Fellow of the Royal Society Te Apārangi since 1997.

Academic career
Born in 1943, Hill completed a PhD titled Studies of the structure and function of the DNA of the filamentous bacteriophages in 1980 through the Department of Biochemistry at the University of Otago. She followed this with postdoctoral research at Cambridge, UK.

Hill worked on techniques for sequencing of DNA and proteins, before becoming involved in animal breeding through the Invermay Agricultural Centre in Mosgiel. Hill recognised that the elite research flocks held at the centre offered the opportunity to explore the genetics of traits important for animal production. Prior to this it was generally held that such traits were quantitative, however Hill and her team were able to develop methods for the identification of single genes responsible for some traits. This work led to New Zealand's first major agri-biotechnology project, the University of Otago and AgResearch joint Molecular Biology Unit, established in 1989. The unit created gene maps for sheep and deer as well as developing sheep as models for human diseases. The Royal Society awarded the work a Silver Medal for team excellence in 1996.

Hill established Global Technologies (NZ) Ltd in 1999, a joint venture with Silver Fern Farms.

Hill was awarded a Personal Chair at the University of Otago. From 1999 to 2001 Hill chaired the Marsden Fund committee, and was the second Chair of the Marsden Fund Council, taking over from Ian Axford in 2001.

Honours and awards 
Hill received a New Zealand Suffrage Centennial Medal in 1993. She was elected a Fellow of the Royal Society of New Zealand in 1997. Hill was appointed a Companion of the New Zealand Order of Merit, for services to science, in the 2002 Queen's Birthday and Golden Jubilee Honours.

Selected work

References

1943 births
Living people
New Zealand geneticists
University of Otago alumni
Academic staff of the University of Otago
Fellows of the Royal Society of New Zealand
New Zealand biochemists
Recipients of the New Zealand Suffrage Centennial Medal 1993
New Zealand women academics
New Zealand women scientists